HIPC may refer to:

International Conference on High Performance Computing
Heavily indebted poor countries

See also
 HICP, Harmonised Index of Consumer Prices